Abdelâali Zahraoui (born 9 January 1949) is a Moroccan footballer. He competed in the tournament at the 1972 Summer Olympics.

References

External links
 

1949 births
Living people
Moroccan footballers
Morocco international footballers
Olympic footballers of Morocco
Footballers at the 1972 Summer Olympics
1976 African Cup of Nations players
Africa Cup of Nations-winning players
Maghreb de Fès players
Botola players
Place of birth missing (living people)
Association football midfielders